Anne Marie Mumolo (born July 10, 1973) is an American actress, screenwriter, comedian, and producer, best known for co-writing the 2011 film Bridesmaids with Kristen Wiig, for which she was nominated for an Academy Award and a BAFTA for Best Original Screenplay. She and Wiig also co-wrote the screenplay and played leading roles for the 2021 comedy film Barb and Star Go to Vista Del Mar. She has also appeared in films such as This Is 40 (2012), Afternoon Delight (2013), The Boss (2016), Bad Moms (2016), Queenpins (2020), and Confess, Fletch (2022).

Early life
Mumolo was born in Irvine, California, to a dentist father and a homemaker mother, Alice. She is of Italian descent. Her grandfather, Dominic Mumolo, was a studio musician on staff at NBC from 1949 to 1971, where he played on The Dean Martin Show, Rowan & Martin's Laugh-In, The Andy Williams Show, and The Tonight Show. He also recorded with musicians including Frank Sinatra, Nat King Cole, and Nelson Riddle.

Mumolo graduated from Mater Dei High School in 1991 and the University of California, Berkeley, where she was a member of Chi Omega and received her B.A. in history in 1995.

Career
Mumolo began her career as a member of the improvisational comedy troupe The Groundlings. She appeared in the 2005 comedy film Bewitched and television shows such as The Minor Accomplishments of Jackie Woodman, Out of Practice, and Two and a Half Men. She started voice acting in 2004 on the television series Maya & Miguel. She was an actress on Random! Cartoons, for the segments Hero Heights, Sparkles and Gloom, and Thom Cat. She appeared in two ABC pilots in 2009, Bad Mother's Handbook and This Might Hurt. She voiced Jimmy and Natalie in the cartoon short series Ape Escape on Nicktoons Network in 2007. In 2009, Mumolo wrote an episode of In the Motherhood titled "Where There's a Will, There's a Wake".

In 2011, Mumolo played an anxious airline passenger in the comedy film, Bridesmaids, which she wrote with fellow Groundlings performer Kristen Wiig. The film was released that spring by Universal Pictures to critical acclaim, making US$167 million in North America and US$280 million worldwide. She received Academy Award for Best Writing (Original Screenplay), BAFTA Award for Best Original Screenplay and Writers Guild of America Award for Best Original Screenplay nominations. Following the success of Bridesmaids, Mumolo played a supporting role in the 2012 comedy film This Is 40, which was directed by Judd Apatow. In 2013, she appeared in Joey Soloway's comedy-drama film Afternoon Delight, and from 2014 to 2015 she was a regular cast member in the NBC comedy series About a Boy.

After Bridesmaids, Mumolo was fired as a writer for the 20th Century Fox biographical film Joy, which might have had Kristen Wiig star as Joy Mangano. After several changes made by director David O. Russell, she received only a "story by" credit. In a 2021 interview, Mumolo said "As a writer, you’re treated very differently than you are as an actor, in almost every way. I feel like it’s exponentially harder for that reason alone. The ‘Joy’ movie was a very heartbreaking experience for me, and I had to just sort of separate because of that aspect of things. When it was going in one direction, we got a phone call overnight that there's a change happening. And then I was asked to do things that were against my morality, and it was very difficult. When I didn't feel comfortable doing those things that were against my values, I was lambasted. I can't say too much. I guess probably because I was living in fear.”

In 2016, Mumolo appeared in the two comedy films. The first was The Boss starring Melissa McCarthy and directed by Ben Falcone, and the second was box-office hit Bad Moms alongside Mila Kunis, Kristen Bell, Kathryn Hahn, Jada Pinkett Smith, and Christina Applegate. In 2017, she co-wrote biographical drama film Megan Leavey directed by Gabriela Cowperthwaite. On television, she had a recurring role on Angie Tribeca and played a leading role in the 2017 comedy pilot Amy’s Brother. In 2020, Mumolo recurred on the comedy-mystery Mapleworth Murders for Quibi.

In 2021, Mumolo re-teamed with Wiig on Barb and Star Go to Vista Del Mar, which they co-wrote and co-starred in. Originally scheduled for a 2020 release, the film was pushed back due to the COVID-19 pandemic and released in the United States via PVOD on February 12, 2021, by Lionsgate. The film received generally positive reviews from critics. Also in 2021, it was announced that Mumolo and Wiig would write a Disney live-action musical comedy centering on the evil stepsisters Anastasia and Drizella from the animated classic Cinderella. In 2022, Mumolo appeared in the crime comedy film, Confess, Fletch. She also starred in the upcoming comedy films Murder Mystery 2 and Joy Ride. She was cast in the drama film The Idea of You starring and produced by Anne Hathaway.

Personal life
Mumolo was married to Tim Lovestedt from 2005 to 2016. The couple have two children.

Filmography

Film

Television

References

External links

1973 births
21st-century American actresses
Actresses from California
American film actresses
American women screenwriters
American television actresses
American voice actresses
American women comedians
Living people
People from Irvine, California
American writers of Italian descent
University of California, Berkeley alumni
Comedians from California
Screenwriters from California
21st-century American comedians
21st-century American screenwriters